Johan Huges (30 August 1904 – 4 January 1986) was a Dutch rower. He competed at the 1928 Summer Olympics in Amsterdam with the men's eight where they were eliminated in round two.

References

1904 births
1986 deaths
Dutch male rowers
Olympic rowers of the Netherlands
Rowers at the 1928 Summer Olympics
Rowers from Amsterdam
European Rowing Championships medalists
20th-century Dutch people